Phyllonorycter turanica is a moth of the family Gracillariidae. It is known from Afghanistan, North Macedonia, Armenia, Iran, Azerbaijan, Georgia, Kazakhstan, Kyrgyzstan, the Caucasus, Tajikistan, Turkmenistan and Uzbekistan.

There are up to five generations per year.

The larvae feed on Cerasus, Crataegus laciniata, Cydonia species (including Cydonia oblonga), Malus species (including Malus domestica), Prunus dulcis and Pyrus species. They mine the leaves of their host plant. They feed mainly on parechymatous tissue below the upper leaf surface, leaving the veins and upper cuticle intact. Full-grown larvae overwinter in fallen leaves.

References

turanica
Moths of Asia
Moths described in 1931